The New Zealand women's national cricket team toured Australia in October 2006. They first played against Australia in one Twenty20 International, which ended in a tie before Australia won on a bowl out. The two sides then played in five One Day Internationals, which were to contest the Rose Bowl. Australia won the series 5–0.

Squads

Tour Match

50-over match: Queensland v New Zealand

Only WT20I

WODI Series

1st ODI

2nd ODI

3rd ODI

4th ODI

5th ODI

Notes

References

External links
New Zealand Women tour of Australia 2006/07 from Cricinfo

Women's international cricket tours of Australia
2006 in Australian cricket
New Zealand women's national cricket team tours